Somanur railway station is a station in Coimbatore district of Tamil Nadu, India. It is located 3 Km away from Karumathampatti. Trains plying between Tiruppur and Coimbatore passes via Somanur.

References

Salem railway division
Railway stations in Coimbatore district